Sergio Domini (born 11 March 1961 in Udine) is an Italian former professional footballer who played as a midfielder.

He played 5 seasons (130 games, 5 goals) in Serie A for A.S. Roma, A.C. Cesena, S.S. Lazio and Brescia Calcio. He did not make his Serie A debut until the age of 26 after spending his first 8 seasons in the lower leagues.

References

1961 births
Living people
Italian footballers
Association football midfielders
Serie A players
Serie B players
Serie C players
S.P.A.L. players
Modena F.C. players
Genoa C.F.C. players
A.S. Roma players
A.C. Cesena players
S.S. Lazio players
Brescia Calcio players
S.S.D. Lucchese 1905 players